Nikolai Pronin (born April 13, 1979) is a Russian professional ice hockey winger who currently plays for HC CSKA Moscow of the Kontinental Hockey League (KHL).

Career statistics

References

External links

1979 births
Living people
Russian ice hockey left wingers
Atlant Moscow Oblast players
Avtomobilist Yekaterinburg players
Charlotte Checkers (1993–2010) players
HC CSKA Moscow players
Metallurg Magnitogorsk players
Rubin Tyumen players
Thunder Bay Thunder Cats (UHL) players
Toledo Storm players
Zvezda Chekhov players